Slavoljub Eduard Penkala (20 April 1871 – 5 February 1922) was a Slovak engineer and inventor of Dutch-Polish descent.

Biography

Eduard Penkala was born in Liptószentmiklós (now Liptovský Mikuláš), then part of Austria-Hungary, to Franciszek Pękała, who was of Polish heritage, and Maria Pękała (née Hannel), who was of Dutch descent. He attended the University of Vienna and Royal Saxon Polytechnic Institute, graduating from the latter on March 25, 1898, and going on to earn a doctorate in organic chemistry. During his studies, he attended violin lessons where he met his future wife, pianist Emily Stoffregen. He then moved with his wife to Zagreb (which was then in the Kingdom of Croatia-Slavonia). To mark his loyalty to his new homeland, he took on the Croatian name Slavoljub (Croatian for "slavophile"), becoming a naturalized Croat.

He became renowned for further development of the mechanical pencil (1906) - then called an "automatic pencil" - and the first solid-ink fountain pen (1907). On 24 January 1906 he registered the patent for an automatic pencil. Collaborating with an entrepreneur by the name of Edmund Moster, he started the Penkala-Moster Company and built a pen-and-pencil factory that was one of the biggest in the world at the time. As the business grew, a second factory was set up in Berlin. 
The company, now called TOZ Penkala, still exists today.

He also constructed the first Croatian aircraft to fly in the country, the Penkala 1910 Biplane, flown by Dragutin Novak, who was also the first Croatian pilot. He constructed and invented many other products and devices, and held a total of 80 patents.

Among his patented inventions were:

 a thermophore 
 a hot water bottle - his first patented invention, the "Termofor"
 a type of bluing detergent
 a rail-car brake
 an anode battery

He also founded another company called the Elevator Chemical Manufacturing Company, which produced various chemicals such as detergents, sealing wax, and "Radium Vinovica", a patent-medicine – like product that was billed as curing rheumatism.

He had four children with his wife, Emily.

Penkala died in Zagreb at the age of 50, after catching pneumonia on a business trip. He was buried at the Mirogoj Cemetery.

See also 
 Edmund Moster

References

External links

"About Eduard Slavoljub Penkala"—Biography of Eduard Slavoljub Penkala at the web site of the book Penkala Writing Instruments, by Miroslav Tischler.
"History of Croatian Science: Eduard (Slavoljub) Penkala"—from the web site "Croatia - Overview of History, Culture and Science", by Darko Zubrinic.
TOZ-Penkala

1871 births
1922 deaths
Austro-Hungarian businesspeople
Aviation pioneers
Burials at Mirogoj Cemetery
Croatian Austro-Hungarians
Croatian businesspeople
Croatian inventors
Croatian people of Dutch descent
Croatian people of Polish descent
Deaths from pneumonia in Yugoslavia
TU Dresden alumni
Naturalized citizens of Croatia
Patent medicine businesspeople
People from Liptovský Mikuláš
Engineers from Zagreb